Anwärter  is a German title which translates as “candidate” or "applicant". During the Nazi era, Anwärter/SS-Anwärter was used as a paramilitary rank by both the Nazi Party and the SS. Within the Nazi Party, an Anwärter was someone who had been accepted into a government service position and the rank was issued in two degrees: one for party members and the other for non-party members. Anwärter was the lowest Nazi Party rank in a complex and extensive system of Nazi Party political ranks leading up to such positions as Gauleiter and Reichsleiter.

As an SS rank, an SS-Anwärter was someone who had applied for membership in the SS and was undergoing a probationary period, after which time an appointment would be issued to the rank of SS-Mann. The earliest recorded use of Anwärter as an SS rank was 1932; however, the rank was used as title dating back to 1925.

Within the Allgemeine-SS, the transition from Anwärter to Mann was an extensive process, typically taking over one year. During that year, a potential SS member would be drilled and indoctrinated; racial, political, and background checks would also be conducted. At the end of this time, typically in an elaborate ceremony, an Anwärter would be promoted to the rank of SS-Mann.

After 1941, Anwärter was also used as a rank of the Waffen-SS, but to a much lesser degree than in the general SS. A Waffen-SS Anwärter was usually a recruit who had been processed into the SS (typically at a recruiting station), but had yet to report for basic training. Once basic training began, the Anwärter was promoted to the rank of SS-Schütze.

Between 1942 and 1945, an even lower rank existed within the SS known as Bewerber. The SS was the only Nazi paramilitary group to have a rank lower than that of Anwärter. The SS rank of Anwärter used no insignia; however, the Nazi Party rank displayed a bare collar tab with eagle and swastika pin issued for those Anwärters who were already Nazi party members.

In modern-day Germany, the title of Anwärter is typically used by those applying for employment and also as a designation for members of the Bundeswehr who are under consideration for a leadership assignment.

Insignia

Notes

Bibliography

SS ranks
Nazi political ranks